Fatimata M'baye (born 1957) is a Mauritanian lawyer. She has campaigned for human rights in her country. In 2016, she was given an International Women of Courage Award by the U.S. Secretary of State.

Life
M'Baye was born in 1957 in Mauritania. At age 12 she was forcibly married to a 45-year-old man, but fought her family for the chance to attend school. From 1981 to 1985 she studied law and economics at the University of Nouakchott, becoming the first female lawyer in her home country.

In 1991, Fatimata Mbaye helped to found the Mauritanian Human Rights Association, or AMDH, and became the Association's president in 2006. In 1998, a report on the still-extant and widespread practice of slavery in Mauritania aired on French television, she and the organization's then president, Cheikh Saad Bouh Kamara, were arrested without warrant. She was charged with the crime of being a member of a non-government approved association, sentenced to 13 months in prison, and a large fine.

M'Baye is Chair of the Committee for Women's Rights and founder and leader of the Social Commission of the AMDH. She is a consulting lawyer of various organizations and in 1997 she was an observer in the presidential elections in Mauritania.

Her commitment to oppression and slavery in Mauritania brought her in 1987, a prison sentence of six months. In 1998, she was sentenced to another prison term of thirteen months for belonging to an unapproved union, yet under the pressure of an international campaign she was pardoned by the country's President.

Mbaye began to receive international attention after her work and life was included in "Mauritania: A Question of Rape," a BBC documentary on the convictions of female rape survivors with the crime of zina.

In 2013, Mbaye joined a three-person UN commission of inquiry in the Central African Republic with Bernard Muna and Philip Alston. This commission worked in a hostile and violent atmosphere and in a constrained manner, but in 2015 released a final report to the Security Council accusing all belligerent parties in the CAR Civil War of crimes against humanity.

Awards 
Fatimata Mbaye received the Nuremberg International Human Rights Award for her fight against slavery in Mauritania and racial/ethnic discrimination in 1999.

In 2012, Hillary Clinton honored Mbaye as a Hero in the Trafficking in Persons Report.

On March 28, 2016, John Kerry, as Secretary of State, recognized Fatimata Mbaye during the 2016 International Women of Courage Awards for her contributions to the legal protection of human rights in Mauritania and her commitment to human dignity, stating:

M'Baye has three children.

See also 
 First women lawyers around the world

References 

1957 births
Living people
Mauritanian women
20th-century Mauritanian lawyers
21st-century Mauritanian lawyers
Mauritanian women lawyers
Recipients of the International Women of Courage Award